GOL PLAY is a Spanish sports television network dedicated fully to football (from 2009) and other sports (from 2016). The channel, created by Mediapro in September 2008, is distributed through cable operators, Internet television, and from August 2009, through digital terrestrial television.

Mediapro's original intention was to broadcast the channel through terrestrial television, opening a slot for pay television, and in 2009 negotiations began with the Government of Spain. On 13 August 2009, an urgent decree approved premium contents on terrestrial television, and Gol Televisión began its broadcasting on 14 August.

History 
For the current history, see also :es: Gol (canal de televisión)

The channel previously existed as Gol Televisión and was broadcasting from September 19, 2008 until June 30, 2015, when the rental agreement between Mediapro and Atresmedia ended to broadcast in one of its multiplexes. The channel was replaced, already outside the DTT, by beIN Sports thanks to the agreement between Mediapro and Al Jazeera (owner of beIN globally).

Mediapro managed to rent a frequency to return to DTT in Spain after the licensing contest of 2015.

On March 22, 2016, Mediapro announced that it would regain the name of Gol T for its new open channel on DTT. During the weeks prior to the presentation of the channel, Mediapro issued a video loop with images of various sports and a text that indicated that soon on that frequency you could enjoy a new sports channel. During this period, the night of April 11 to 12, 2016, the boxing match between Pacquiao and Bradley III was aired.

Finally, on June 1, 2016, the channel's test emissions began, already with the GOL logo (without the 'T'). During the broadcasts in tests, several live competitions were broadcast, including football, tennis, motor, extreme sports, etc.

On June 29, 2016 the Galician operator R Galicia incorporated the signal to channel 80 of its television service, thus being the first operator to have the sports channel.

On August 16, 2016, the operator Movistar + added the signal to channel 62 of its television service, both in satellite, IPTV and Fiber. Subsequently, on November 25, 2016, it incorporated the HD signal of the channel on the same channel, for fiber clients, but not for satellite clients.

On August 17, 2016, operator Vodafone TV incorporated the SD signal into channel 99 of its television service. On November 3, 2016, operator Vodafone TV incorporated the signal in HD 1080i to channel 99 of its television service.

On August 12, 2022, the channel was renamed as GOL PLAY, after this change films, series and entertainment programs were added to the programming. The reform of the channel was carried out to improve the audience levels in the time slots where sports are not broadcast, however, the transmission of events and sports information continued to be the fundamental points of the channel's grid.

Programming

Current

Football

Soccer 

FIFA
Men's:
FIFA World Cup (2014, returned for 2022)
FIFA U-20 World Cup (2019 and 2022)
FIFA U-17 World Cup (2019 and 2022)
 Women's
FIFA Women's World Cup (2019)
FIFA U-20 Women's World Cup (2020 and 2022)
FIFA U-17 Women's World Cup (2020 and 2022)

UEFA:
Men's
UEFA Europa League (2018-2021)
Women's
UEFA Women's Champions League (selected matches, include final 2018-2021)
LFP:
Men's
La Liga
Segunda División
División de Honor Juvenil de Fútbol
Women's
Liga Iberdrola
Copa de la Reina de Fútbol (selected matches, exclude final)
 International Champions Cup

Futsal 

 FIFA:
FIFA Futsal World Cup (2020)
UEFA:
UEFA Futsal Champions League (final four only)

Beach soccer 

 FIFA
 FIFA Beach Soccer World Cup (2019 and 2021)

Other sports(from 2016)

Combat sports 

 ONE Championship

Mixed martial arts 
 UFC
Bellator MMA
M-1 Challenge

Kick boxing 
Enfusion

Boxing 

 Matchroom
 Golden Boy
 Premier Boxing Champions

Padel 
 World Padel Tour

Hockey

Ice 
 NHL

Field 
 FIH Men's and Women's Hockey Pro League (Spain games only)

Gridiron football 
NFL

Extreme sports 
X Games

Other programs

Current 

 Directo Gol
 El Golazo de Gol
 Los Infiltrados
 Gol Sports

Former 

Gol Noticias
Planeta Axel
Informe Gol TV
Goles Liga BBVA
Estrellas del Gol
Premier World

See also
Mediapro
beIN Sports Spain

References

External links

Defunct television channels in Spain
Television channels and stations established in 2008
Television channels and stations disestablished in 2015
2008 establishments in Spain
2015 disestablishments in Spain
Spanish-language television stations
Sports television in Spain
Association football on television